Eddie Jordan Racing was a British racing stable founded by Irish racing driver Eddie Jordan in 1980.

The team won Formula 3000 the drivers' championship in 1989 with Jean Alesi. The team competed in Formula 3 and Formula 3000. After great success in Formula 3000, they decided to try Formula One. They changed their name to Jordan Grand Prix and began competing in F1 in 1991.

Complete Formula 3000 results
(key) (Races in bold indicate pole position; races in italics indicate fastest lap)

References

External links
 Eddie Jordan Racing Speedsport-magazine.com
 Eddie Jordan Racing Motorsportmagazine.com

British auto racing teams
International Formula 3000 teams
FIA European Formula 3 Championship teams
British Formula Three teams
Auto racing teams established in 1980
Auto racing teams disestablished in 1991